American singer-songwriter Taylor Swift has headlined six concert tours and four one-off concerts, and performed in 21 music festivals and 204 live events. She first promoted her debut album, Taylor Swift, in 2006 and 2007 through performances at several award ceremonies and television shows, including the 42nd ACM Awards and Good Morning America. She then served as an opening act on tour for Rascal Flatts (2006), George Strait (2007), Kenny Chesney (2007), Brad Paisley (2007–08), and Tim McGraw and Faith Hill's joint tour (2007).

In 2009, she embarked on her first concert tour, the Fearless Tour, which visited North America, Europe, Australia and Asia, and grossed over $63 million. She embarked on the Speak Now World Tour in 2011, which visited Asia, Europe, North America, and Oceania. At the end of 2011, the tour placed fourth on Pollstar's annual "Top 25 Worldwide Tours", earning $104.2 million with 100 shows. This made it the highest-grossing tour by a female artist and by a solo artist in 2011. The tour ended in March 2012, and grossed over $123 million.

Swift's next tours broke world records. The Red Tour (2013–14) grossed $150 million, becoming the highest-grossing tour by a country artist in history. The 1989 World Tour (2015) became Swift's highest grossing and most attended tour at the time, attracting 2,278,647 fans and grossing over $250 million. It became the highest-grossing tour in 2015, as well as one of the highest-grossing tours of the decade. Grossing over $199.4 million in North America alone, the 1989 World Tour surpassed the previous all-time high of $162 million set by the Rolling Stones in 2005; Swift became the first female artist in music history to do so. With her 2018 Reputation Stadium Tour, she topped her own grossing and attendance counts set during the 1989 World Tour, including a record $14 million take from 107,550 sold tickets at Levi's Stadium. In North America, the Reputation Stadium Tour grossed $202.3 million, breaking Swift's own record for the highest-grossing tour by a female artist on that continent, previously held by the 1989 World Tour, with fewer dates. The Reputation Stadium Tour also broke the record for the highest-grossing US tour of all time.

Swift's planned sixth tour, Lover Fest, was set to visit stadiums and music festivals beginning on April 5, 2020, but was canceled following the fallout of the COVID-19 pandemic. It was subsequently revamped as the Eras Tour, scheduled to begin in March 2023.

Concert tours

One-off concerts

Music festivals

Award shows

TV shows and specials

Radio shows and specials

Other live performances

Notes

References

Swift, Taylor